Jakusko is a Local Government Area in Yobe State, Nigeria.

It has an area of 3,941 km and a population of 229,083 at the 2006 census.

The postal code of the area is 631.

The Bade language is spoken in Jakusko LGA.

See also 
 List of Local Government Areas in Yobe State

References

Local Government Areas in Yobe State